Sullivan Ballou (March 28, 1829July 29, 1861) was an American lawyer and politician from Rhode Island, and an officer in the Union Army during the American Civil War. He is remembered for an  eloquent letter he wrote to his wife Sarah a week before he was mortally wounded in the First Battle of Bull Run. He was left behind by retreating Union forces and died a week after the battle.

Early life
Ballou was born the son of Hiram (1802–1833) and Emeline (Bowen) Ballou, a distinguished Huguenot family in Smithfield, Rhode Island. He lost his father at a young age. In spite of this, he attended boarding school at Nichols Academy in Dudley, Massachusetts, and Phillips Academy in Andover, Massachusetts. After graduation from Phillips, he attended Brown University, where he was a member of Delta Phi, and went on to study law at the National Law School, in Ballston, New York. He was admitted to the bar in Rhode Island and began practice in 1853.

Ballou married Sarah Hart Shumway on October 15, 1855. They had two sons, Edgar and William.

Ballou was active in public affairs. In 1854, soon after beginning his law practice, he was elected to the Rhode Island House of Representatives. He was chosen as Clerk of the House, and later as the Speaker. He was a staunch Republican and supporter of Abraham Lincoln.

Civil War
After the bombardment of Fort Sumter in April 1861, President Lincoln called on the States loyal to the Union to provide 75,000 militia troops. Ballou promptly volunteered, and encouraged others to do the same. He was commissioned a major in the 2nd Rhode Island Infantry Regiment. He was third in command of the Regiment, after Colonel John Slocum and Lieutenant Colonel Frank Wheaton. He was also appointed judge advocate of the Rhode Island militia.

After training at Camp Clark in Washington D.C., the 2nd Rhode Island had joined the Union Army of Northeastern Virginia by July 1861. On July 21, the regiment took part in the First Battle of Bull Run, which was the first major battle of the American Civil War. The 2nd Rhode Island Infantry were in the Second Brigade under the command by Colonel Ambrose Burnside, which was part of Second Division in the Union Army of Northeastern Virginia.

Death
During a Confederate attack at Bull Run, Ballou was hit by a six-pounder cannonball which tore off part of his right leg and killed his horse. He was carried off the field, and the remainder of his leg was amputated in a makeshift hospital at Sudley Church, Manassas. However, after the Union Army was defeated in battle and forced to retreat back to Washington, Ballou and the other wounded were left behind.

Ballou died from his injuries a week later and was buried in Sudley Church's graveyard. He was one of 94 men of the 2nd Rhode Island killed or mortally wounded at Bull Run. He was 32 at the time of his death; his wife Sarah was 24.

The battle area was occupied by Confederate forces, and Ballou's body was allegedly exhumed, decapitated, and burned by Confederate troops; his body was never recovered. In place of his body, some charred ash and bone from Sudley were reburied in Swan Point Cemetery in Providence, Rhode Island.

Sarah Ballou never remarried. She later moved to New Jersey to live with her son, William. She died aged 82 in 1917; she is buried next to her husband.

Letter
Ballou's now-famous letter to his beloved 24-year-old wife, Sarah, endeavored to express the emotions he was feeling on the eve of battle against the Confederacy: worry, fear, guilt, and sadness, while at the same time conveying his undying love for her and his children and his desire to fulfil his sense of duty to his nation.

The letter, which was probably never mailed, was said to have been found in Ballou's trunk after he died. It was reclaimed and personally delivered to Ballou's widow by the Governor of Rhode Island, William Sprague, after the governor had personally gone to Virginia a year later to reclaim effects of dead Rhode Island soldiers.

Media
The letter was featured prominently in Ken Burns' 1990 award-winning documentary The Civil War, where an abridged version was read by Paul Roebling in a pairing with Jay Ungar's musical piece "Ashokan Farewell".

The letter has also the inspiration for the song ‘Dearest Sarah’ by the band Goodnight, Texas.

The letter was the inspiration for the MMO "World of Warcraft" quest "Sully Balloo's Letter" for the Alliance faction.  The letter must be delivered to his widow, Sara Balloo.

References

External links

 
 Text of the letter set to music by John Kander, sung by soprano Renée Fleming

1829 births
1861 deaths
19th-century American politicians
19th-century American lawyers
American letter writers
Union Army officers
Union military personnel killed in the American Civil War
People of Rhode Island in the American Civil War
Speakers of the Rhode Island House of Representatives
Republican Party members of the Rhode Island House of Representatives
Rhode Island lawyers
State and National Law School alumni
Brown University alumni
Nichols College alumni
Phillips Academy alumni
People from Providence County, Rhode Island
Burials at Swan Point Cemetery